The Treaty of Teusina, Tyavzin or Tyavzino, also known as the Eternal Peace with Sweden in Russia, was concluded by Russian diplomats under the boyar Afanasiy Pushkin (an ancestor of the poet Aleksandr Pushkin) and ambassadors of the Swedish king at the village of  in Ingria on 18 May 1595 to end the Russo-Swedish War (1590–95) between the powers. 

The treaty revised the provisions of the Truce of Plussa of 1583 and restored to Russia all territory then ceded to Sweden except for Narva. Russia received most of Ingria, with the towns of Ivangorod, Jama, Koporye and Korela Fortress. In effect, the treaty restored the borders predating the Livonian War. The Swedish-Russian border was delineated from the outstream of the Systerbäck river into the Gulf of Finland, over lakes Saimaa, Inari, the settlement of Neiden and up to the Murman Sea. Russia had to renounce all claims on Estonia including Narva, and Sweden's sovereignty over Estonia from 1561 was confirmed.

Sweden regained control over Ingria by the Treaty of Stolbovo in 1617, after the Ingrian War.

See also
List of treaties

Sources

External links
Text in Swedish with Finnish Translation
Scan of the treaty (IEG Mainz)

Teusina
Teusina
Teusina
1595 in Sweden
1595 in Russia
1595 treaties
Russia–Sweden treaties